Doug Kriewald (born August 30, 1945) is a former American football guard. He played for the Chicago Bears from 1967 to 1968.

References

1945 births
Living people
American football guards
West Texas A&M Buffaloes football players
Chicago Bears players